Garristown GAA is a Gaelic Athletic Association club in based in Garristown in the north of County Dublin.

The club fields teams at adult and juvenile level in both ladies and men's football.

In 2023, Garristown GFC are holding an amazing Supedrraw where the top prize on offer is a Range Rover Sport or €100,000 cash. For more information, check out winarangerover.ie

Background
Garristown is a small local club with a loyal and growing membership and a club with big dreams and ambitions for the future. The club is a focal point of our village and provides a sporting outlet the young people of the village, many of whom start playing from as young as 4 with our nursery group.

The club was founded in 1938 and have played at John McDonnell Memorial Park since then. The club compete in the Dublin GAA Football leagues and Championship in both Mens and Ladies football. The Club has tasted success in both codes including Dublin Intermediate Championship wins in 1970, 1982 and 1999, Dublin Junior Championship wins in 1965 and last year in 2022 and a Dublin Ladies Championship wins in 2015 and 2017.

The clubs boy’s juvenile section are part of the amalgamated St Peters teams with our fellow local clubs Ballyboughil and Clann Mhuire. This amalgamation has proved an outstanding success with many of the St Peters teams playing the in top divisions in Dublin. Players play for St Peters from U10 to Minor before returning to their parent clubs to play adult football. Our juvenile ladies teams compete strongly in all competitions. The success of the Juvenile section was highlight in 2022 when our adult men’s team won the Dublin Junior Championship along with tasting league success, with many of the squad having come through the juvenile section.

Honours
Men's
 Dublin Intermediate Football Championship: (3) 1970, 1982, 1999
 Dublin Junior Football Championship: (2) 1965, 2022
 Dublin AFL Division 7 (1)
 2022
 Dublin AFL Division 8 (1)
 2019

Ladies
 '''Dublin Junior G Ladies Football Championship (1)  2015

References